According to Devi-Bhagavata Purana Medha rishi is ancient rishi he is Storyteller of  Duraga Saptashati he tell Goddess Durga story in front of Samadhi vaishaya and Surath king .

References

Durga Puja